This is an incomplete list of original songs composed by the rock band Phish. Certain "sections" of songs have been played separately from time to time, but are not listed below. For instance, the middle section of "Guelah Papyrus" was sometimes played by itself under the name "The Asse Festival.” Before "The Moma Dance" had lyrics, it was called "Black-Eyed Katy.” “Shafty" was once called "Olivia's Pool,” and featured a different arrangement. "Taste" was once known as "The Fog That Surrounds" and contained a slightly different arrangement. And many sections of the multi-part epic "Fluffhead" have been played outside of the song. Some of these sections include "Clod", "The Chase", "Who Do? We Do!!" and "Bundle of Joy.” Phish also performed several songs by The Dude of Life, a friend and collaborator of the band, but those are not listed here, with the exception of songs that The Dude of Life purposely gave to Phish for use in their catalog. Also, songs from the band's solo careers that were also performed by Phish are listed here.



 "35 Minute Jam" (never performed live)  
 "46 Days"

A
 "A Song I Heard the Ocean Sing"  
 "AC/DC Bag" 
 "Access Me"  
 "Acoustic Army" (Also known as The Real Taste of Licorice)  
 "Aftermath" (never played live)  
 "Alaska"  
 "Albert" (never played live)  
</ref> 
 "A Letter To Jimmy Page"  
 "All of These Dreams"  
 "All Things Reconsidered"  
 "Alumni Blues"  
 "Anarchy"  
 "And So To Bed"  
 "Anything But Me"  
 "Architect"  
 "Army of One"  
 "At the Barbecue" (also known as Samson Variation, or Blow Wind Blow)  
 "Avenu Malkenu"  
 "Axilla"  
 "Axilla Part II"

B
 "Babylon Baby"   
 "Back on the Train"  
 "Backwards Down the Number Line"  
 "Backwards Food for Backwards Folks" (never played live)  
 "Bathtub Gin"  
 "Beauty of a Broken Heart"   
 "Big Ball Jam"  
 "Big Black Furry Creature from Mars"  
 "Billy Breathes"  
 "Birds of a Feather"  
 "Birdwatcher, The"  
 "Bittersweet Motel"  
 "Bliss"  
 "Blue Over Yellow" (never played live)   
 "Bouncing Around the Room"  
"Breath and Burning"
 "Brian and Robert"  
 "Brother"  
 "Bubble Wrap" (never played live)  
 "Buffalo Bill" 
 "Bug"   
 "Buried Alive"  
 "Burn That Bridge"  
 "Bye Bye Foot"

C
 "Camel Walk" 
 "Can't Always Listen"  
 "Can't Come Back" (never played live)  
 "Carini"  
 "Cars Trucks Buses"  
 "Catapult"  
 "Cataract Song, The" (also known as Hick Into Walkin' , never played live)  
 "Cavern"  
 "Chalkdust Torture"  
 "Character Zero"  
 "Clone"  
 "Colonel Forbin's Ascent"  
 "Connection, The"  
 "Contact"  
 "Cool Amber And Mercury"  
 "Crowd Control"  
 "Curtain, The"  
 "Curtain With, The" ("The Curtain" plus a long instrumental second half)

D
 "Dave's Energy Guide"  
 "David Bowie"  
 "Dear Mrs. Reagan" 
 "Death Don't Hurt Very Long"   
 "Demand"  
 "Den of Iniquity" (never played live)  
 "Destiny Unbound"  
 "Dinner and a Movie"  
 "Dirt"  
 "Discern"  
 "Divided Sky, The"  
 "Dog Faced Boy" 
 "Dog Log" (formerly known as Dog Gone Dog)  
 "Dogs Stole Things"  
 "Don't Get Me Wrong"  
 "Down With Disease"   
 "Dr. Gabel" 
 "Drifting"  
 "Driver"

E
 "Eliza" 
 "End of Session"  
 "Esther" 
 "Everything Is Hollow"  
 "Everything's Right"

F
 "Faht"  
 "Farmhouse"  
 "Fast Enough for You"  
 "Fee"  
 "Fikus"  
 "Final Flight"  
 "The Final Hurrah"  
 "First Tube" (Formerly known as Bing Bong)  
 "Fish Bass" (never played live)  
 "Flat Fee"  
 "Fluff's Travels"  
 "Fluffhead"  
 "Fly Famous Mockingbird"  
 "Foam"  
 "Frankie Says"  
 "Free"  
 "Friday" 
 "Fuck Your Face"

G
 "Gatekeeper" (never played live)  
 "Ghost"  
 "Glide"  
 "Glide II" (formerly known as Flip)  
 "Golgi Apparatus"  
 "Gone"   
 "Gotta Jibboo"  
 "Grind"  
 "Guantanamo Strut" (never played live)   
 "Guelah Papyrus"  
 "Gumbo"  
 "Guy Forget"  
 "Guyute"

H
 "Ha Ha Ha"  
 "Halfway to the Moon"  
 "Halley's Comet"  
 "Happy Whip and Dung Song, The"  
 "Harpua"  
 "Harry Hood"  
 "He Ent to the Bog" (never played live)  
 "Heartache" (never played live)  
 "Heavy Things"  
 "Horn"  
 "Horse, The"

I
 "I Always Wanted It This Way" 
 "I Am Hydrogen"  
 "I Been Around"   
 "I Didn't Know"  
 "Icculus"  
 "Idea"  
 "If I Could"  
 "If I Told You" (never played live)  
 "In a Hole"  
 "In a Misty Glade" (never played live)  
 "Ingest"  
 "Inlaw Josie Wales, The" (formerly known as Minestrone and Purple Hugh)  
 "Insects"  
 "Invisible"  
 "It's Ice"

J
 "Jaegermeister Song"  
 "Jennifer Dances"  
 "Joy"  
 "Julius"

K
 "Keepin' It Real" 
 "Keyboard Army" 
 "Kill Devil Falls"  
 "Kung"

L
 "Landlady, The"  
 "Last Victor Jam"  
 "Lawn Boy" 
 "Lazy and Red" (never played live) 
 "Leaves" 
 "Lengthwise"
 "Leprechaun" 
 "Let Me Lie" 
 "Letter to Jimmy Page" 
 "Lifeboy" 
 "Light" 
 "Limb By Limb"  
 "Liquid Time" (never played live) 
 "Lizards, The" 
 "Llama"
 "Lushington"

M
 "Maggie's Revenge" (never played live)  
 "Magilla"  
 "Makisupa Policeman"  
 "Man Who Stepped Into Yesterday, The"  
 "Mango Song, The"  
 "Maze"  
 "McGrupp and the Watchful Hosemasters"  
 "Meat"  
 "Meatstick, The"  
 "Mexican Cousin"  
 "Mike's Song" (formerly known as Microdot)  
 "Minkin" (never played live)  
 "Mock Song"  
 "Moma Dance, The" (formerly known as Black-Eyed Katy, sans lyrics)  
 "Montana" 
 "More" 
 "Most Events Aren't Planned" 
 "Mound" 
 "Mountains in the Mist"  
 "Mozambique" (formerly known as Free Thought)  
 "Mr. Completely"  
 "My Friend, My Friend"  
 "My Left Toe"  
 "My Problem Right There"  
 "My Sweet One"

N
 "N02"  
 "Name Is Slick, The" (never played live)  
 "Never"  
 "NICU"  
 "No Dogs Allowed"  
 "Nothing"

O
 "Ocelot"  
 "Oh Kee Pa Ceremony, The"  
Olivia's Pool (formerly known as "Shafty")
 "Only a Dream" (never played live)

P
 "Party Time" 
 "Passing Through" 
 "Pebbles And Marbles"  
 "Pigtail"  
 "Piper" 
 "Play By Play"  
 "Poor Heart"  
 "Possum"  
 "Practical Song, The" (never played live)  
 "Prep School Hippie"  
 "Prince Caspian"  
 "Punch Me in the Eye"  
 "Punch You in the Eye"

Q
"Quadrophonic Toppling"

R
 "Reba"  
 "Revolution"  
 "Rift"  
 "Riker's Mailbox" (never played live)  
 "Rocka William"  
 "Roggae"  
 "Round Room"  
 "Run Like An Antelope"  
 "Runaway Jim"  
 "Running Scared" (never played live)

S
 "Sample in a Jar"  
 "Sand" (formerly known as Symptom)  
 "Sanity"  
 "Saw it Again" 
 "Say It To Me S.A.N.T.O.S." 
 "Scent of a Mule"  
 "Scents and Subtle Sounds"  
 "Secret Smile" 
 "Set Your Soul Free" 
 "Setting Sail"  
 "Seven Below"  
 "Show of Life"  
 "Shrine" (never played live, formerly known as Tooth and Nail)  
 "Silent in the Morning"  
 "Simple"  
 "Skippy the Wondermouse" (set to the music of McGrupp and the Watchful Hosemasters)  
 "Sky Train Wand" (never played live)  
 "Slave to the Traffic Light"  
 "Sleep"  
 "Sleep Again"  
 "Sleeping Monkey"  
 "Sloth, The"  
 "Somantin" (never played live) 
 "Soul Planet" 
 "Sparkle"  
 "Spices"  
 "Splinters of Hail" (never played live)  
 "Split Open and Melt"  
 "Spock's Brain"  
 "Spread it Round"  
 "Squirming Coil, The"  
 "Stash"  
 "Stealing Time From The Faulty Plan"  
 "Steam"  
 "Steep" 
 "Strange Design" 
 "Stray Dog" 
 "Sugar Shack"  
 "Summer of '89" 
 "Sunshine of Your Feeling" 
 "Susskind Hotel"  
 "Suzy Greenberg"  
 "Swept Away"

T
 "Talk"  
 "Taste" (formerly known as The Fog That Surrounds)  
 "Tela"  
 "Theme From the Bottom"  
 "Thunderhead 
 "Time Turns Elastic"  
 "Tiny" (never played live)  
 "Title Track" (never played live)  
 "Tomorrow's Song"  
 “TMWSIY- “The man who stepped into yesterday” 
 "Train Song"  
 "Turtle In The Clouds" 
 "Tube"  
 "Tweezer" (formerly known as Tweezer So Cold)  
 "Tweezer Reprise"  
 "Twenty Years Later"  
 "Twist"  
 "Two Versions of Me"

U
 "Undermind"   
 "Union Federal" (never played live)

V
 "Victor Jam Session" (never played live)  
 "Vultures"

W
 “Waiting All Night”
 "Wading in the Velvet Sea”  
 "Waking Up" (formerly known as Fooled by Images)  
 "Walfredo"  
 "Walls Of The Cave"  
 "Waste"  
 "Water in the Sky"  
 "Waves"  
 "We Are Come To Outlive Our Brains"  
 "Wedge, The"  
 "Weekapaug Groove"  
 "Weekly Time" (never played live)  
 "Weigh"  
 "What Things Seem"  
 "What's the Use?"  
 "Wilson"  
 "Windora Bug"  
 "Windy City"  
 "Wolfman's Brother" 
 "Wombat"

Y

 "You Enjoy Myself"

See also 
List of Phish cover versions

References

Phish